Aval Varuvala is a 1998 Indian Tamil-language romantic comedy thriller film directed by Raj Kapoor. It is the Tamil remake of the 1997 Telugu movie Pelli. The film stars Ajith Kumar and Simran, with Sujatha, Babloo Prithiveeraj, Goundamani and Senthil in other significant roles. It released on 15 May 1998 to positive reviews and became a commercial success.

Plot
Jeeva lives with his grandmother Lakshmi in Madurai and says that he would marry the girl that he likes at first sight. He goes to Chennai after getting a job as a bank manager there. In a shopping mall, he gets a glimpse of Divya and falls in love with her. He identifies her scooter model and goes on a mission in search of her to end up in a colony surrounded by comedians - Dhandabani, Michael Jackson, Major Ramachandran, Savithri, and James Thomson. The colony people mistakenly think that Jeeva is trying to steal the scooter, and therefore, he lied that he was looking for a house to rent. Then, he agrees to stay in the colony after confirming that Divya and her mother Janaki are residing in the colony.

From there on, Jeeva tries to impress Divya. The comedians find out that Jeeva is trying to approach Divya and agree to help him. They ask Janaki's opinion about Divya's marriage. However, Divya refused the offer, saying that she is not interested in getting married. A lonely, sad, pathetic-looking Janaki seemed to hide something. The gang gives a few ideas to persuade Divya, but they all failed. Eventually, tired of foolish ideas, Jeeva tells Janaki that he wants to marry her daughter. Impressed by Jeeva's good manner, Janaki advised Divya to accept him. Truthful to the expectations, Divya revealed that Janaki is actually her mother-in-law.

Knowing that Jeeva loves her, Divya insults him so that he would give up, but he did not. Every time Jeeva did well to her, it reminds her of her ex-husband Prithvi's cruelty, and she started to compare them both. In a dramatic flashback, Prithvi is killed (so we think) by Divya when he encourages his friends to sexually abuse her. Believing that the bad time is behind them, Janaki and Divya start a new life in a new town as a mother-daughter team. Divya falls in love with Jeeva with the comedians' help. However, Janaki did not allow Divya to tell Jeeva about her past. The whole colony was cheered by the news, and they arranged an engagement.

Prithvi returns for their betrothal to reclaim his possession. He blackmails Divya to sleep with him on one night before her marriage and asks Jeeva to sanction him a loan of Rs. 25 lakhs; otherwise, he will reveal the truth to everyone. Somehow, Jeeva knows the truth and claimed to be proud to become Divya's husband. This distracts Prithvi, who then decides to stop the marriage. Wanting to stop Prithvi from doing so, Janaki poisons him and also herself for the sake of a peaceful life for her daughter-in-law.

Cast

Ajith Kumar as Jeeva
Simran as Divya, Prithvi's wife
Sujatha as Janaki
Babloo Prithiveeraj as Prithvi
Goundamani as Dhandapaani
Senthil as Michael Jackson
Vennira Aadai Moorthy as Major Ramachandran
Kovai Sarala as Savithri
Dhamu as James Thomson
Jayalalita as Ammukutty
Kavitha as Roobini
Idichapuli Selvaraj as Nathan
Radhabhai as Lakshmi, Jeeva's grandmother
Master Manikandan as Oosi Babu
Japan Kumar (special appearance in "Sikki Mukki")
Redin Kingsley as Dancer (Uncredited)

Production
The film progressed after another Tamil film based on the same premise was shelved. The shelved Unnai Vida Maatten by MG Pictures starring Sathyaraj, Abbas, and Rambha, had also been a take on Sleeping with the Enemy (1991).

Release
The film released on 15 May 1998. Indolink.com gave the film a positive review citing that "Simran shows she can act too. She is almost getting the correct lip-sync for Tamil dialogues" and "Sujatha is as usual, ready to break into tears at anytime", while "Ajith has very little to do in this female oriented movie". The reviewer added that Prithviraj as the sadist "does a good job, though it looks outrageous."

The producers later worked on a film titled Enna Vilai Azhage in 2000 with Prashanth and Amisha Patel. Despite completing most of the shoot, the makers' financial troubles meant that the project did not release.

Soundtrack
The film soundtrack features score and 6 songs composed by S. A. Rajkumar who retained the tunes from the original Telugu film which he had composed, with lyrics by Palani Bharathi

References

External links

1998 films
Films set in Chennai
1990s Tamil-language films
Indian romantic drama films
Films directed by Raj Kapoor (Tamil film director)
Tamil remakes of Telugu films